West Point Christian Church is a historic church in Yukon, Oklahoma.

It was built in 1898 and was added to the National Register of Historic Places in 1983.

References

Churches in Oklahoma
Churches on the National Register of Historic Places in Oklahoma
Churches completed in 1898
Buildings and structures in Canadian County, Oklahoma
1898 establishments in Oklahoma Territory
National Register of Historic Places in Canadian County, Oklahoma